Shane Alan Loux (born August 31, 1979) is an American minor league baseball pitching coach for the Hillsboro Hops, the High-A affiliate of the Arizona Diamondbacks and a retired pitcher. He played in Major League Baseball (MLB) for the Detroit Tigers, Los Angeles Angels of Anaheim and San Francisco Giants.

Playing career

Detroit Tigers
Loux graduated from Highland High School in Gilbert, Arizona. In the second round of the 1997 MLB draft, Loux was picked by the Detroit Tigers. He made his professional debut that same year for the Gulf Coast League Tigers. Loux started in 9 of his 10 appearances, and he posted a 4–1 record and an 0.84 ERA in 43 innings. After this successful debut, Loux was promoted to the Class West Michigan Whitecaps for 1998. He struggled during his second season, tallying a 7–13 record and a 4.64 ERA in 28 starts.

Between 2002–2003, Loux posted a mark of 1–4 for the Tigers in 44.1 innings. He also struck out 15 and walked 15 batters.

After several years of playing in the minor leagues with Detroit, Loux was let go by the organization after posting an ERA of over 4.30 in 47 games in Triple A from 2003–2004.

In September 2004, Lewis Yocum performed Tommy John surgery on Loux.

2005 season
Loux did not pitch with any organization in 2005.

Kansas City Royals
Loux returned to professional baseball, signing a Minor League deal with the Kansas City Royals. He pitched out of the bullpen the whole year, posting a 2–5 record with a 6.46 ERA in 31 games.

Los Angeles Angels of Anaheim

Loux made his return to the Major Leagues for the Angels following a 12–6 record in Triple-A and being named Pacific Coast League Pitcher of the Year. In his first game, he went two innings, not allowing a hit, but walking one batter.

In 2009, he appeared in 18 games, 6 starts for the Angels. He posted a record of 2–3 in 58.1 innings, allowing 84 hits and walking as many as he struck out (19).

In October 2009, Loux was granted free agency.

Houston Astros
Loux signed a Minor League deal with the Houston Astros.

He posted a 6–12 record in 20 games.

San Francisco Giants
Loux signed a Minor League deal with the San Francisco Giants.

Loux pitched for the Triple A Fresno Grizzlies in 2011, posting an 8–12 record. Loux pitched a career high 179.1 innings with a SO/BB of 2.05 in 28 starts. On October 31, 2011, the Giants re-signed Loux.

In 2012, after posting a 1.41 ERA in 23 games in Triple A, Loux was called up by the Giants. In 25.1 innings, Loux struck out 9 and walked 9 with a 4.97 ERA for the Giants. He would land on the DL on June 29 with a neck strain.

In 2013, after posting a 4.09 ERA in 9 games for the Triple A Fresno Grizzlies, Loux announced via Twitter on July 11, 2013 that he would undergo season-ending Tommy John surgery. His surgery was scheduled for July 12, 2013.

Sugar Land Skeeters
Loux signed an Atlantic League deal with the Sugar Land Skeeters.

In 2015, after rehabilitation from Tommy John surgery during the 2014 season, Loux signed to pitch for the Skeeters. He announced his retirement from baseball on July 10, 2015.

Coaching career

Arizona Diamondbacks
In 2017, Loux became a minor league pitching coach in the Arizona Diamondbacks organization, coaching for the Missoula Osprey.

Loux was named Pitching Coach of the Visalia Rawhide of the Arizona Diamondbacks organization in 2019.

Scouting report
Loux was a sinkerballer (low 90s), using the pitch more than half the time. His main secondary pitch is a cutter (mid 80s) along with a curveball and a changeup.

Throughout his career, he pitched to contact, relying on his sinker.

References

External links

1979 births
Living people
Sportspeople from Rapid City, South Dakota
Baseball coaches from South Dakota
Baseball players from South Dakota
Major League Baseball pitchers
Detroit Tigers players
Los Angeles Angels players
San Francisco Giants players
Gulf Coast Tigers players
West Michigan Whitecaps players
Lakeland Tigers players
Jacksonville Suns players
Toledo Mud Hens players
Omaha Royals players
Rancho Cucamonga Quakes players
Salt Lake Bees players
Round Rock Express players
Arizona League Giants players
Fresno Grizzlies players
Sugar Land Skeeters players
Minor league baseball coaches